MonsterVision was an American variety series which aired on TNT from June 29, 1991 to September 16, 2000.
The show underwent multiple changes throughout its over nine-year run. Initially, the program (which acted as a marathon of older horror, science fiction, or fantasy films) revolved around a mysterious claymation-style moon character who was featured in the bumpers alongside a creepy-sounding disembodied voice, who served as the narrator for the show and its promos. Additionally, the show was regularly paired alongside the series 100% Weird, which brought viewers even more bizarre films. Later, in June 1993, entertainment duo Penn & Teller guest-hosted MonsterVision marathons featuring mainly old B-Movies from the 1950s and 1960s. Then, by Saturday, July 31, 1993, the narrator of the series became solely a voice-over announcer.

From 1996 until around the show's cancellation in 2000, the series was hosted by Joe Bob Briggs, and featured mainly classic horror and schlock films from the 1970s to the 1990s. Here, much of the original formatting under Briggs was derived from his earlier work on The Movie Channel program, Joe Bob's Drive-in Theater. Yet, this series would also incorporate Joe Bob's Last Call, a segment that presented that night's final film. Then, in 1999, the overall program became styled as Joe Bob's Hollywood Saturday Night and MonsterVision, before ultimately returning to its non-host format in mid-2000.

Format and series overview

Pre-Joe Bob Briggs (1991–1996) 
When MonsterVision premiered on Saturday, June 29, 1991, it was little more than a marathon of older horror, science fiction, or fantasy films beginning at 8:00 PM ET and ending well into the early morning. With a claymation-style moon character serving as the original narrator and 'host,' broadcasts tended to air monthly, as well as on certain holidays. Films often fit a general theme, such as "TNT Salutes The Outer Limits," "Halloween Night," "Attack of the Sea Monsters," "A Christmas Nightmare," "Harryhausen Havoc," or recurring "Godzilla Marathons," although other occasions had somewhat unrelated choices. Additionally, MonsterVision sometimes had special events, such as their "Dracula Weekend," which had a mini-interview with Christopher Lee in honor of the release of Bram Stoker's Dracula (1992). A number of later marathons, beginning on Saturday, June 5, 1993, were presented by the well-known entertainment duo Penn & Teller, before the show then transitioned to voice-over narration for the remaining duration of this period.

Joe Bob Briggs era (1996–2000) 
Beginning on Friday, June 28, 1996, Joe Bob Briggs (John Bloom), the drive-in movie critic, became the official host of MonsterVision, with the series transitioning into a regularly scheduled Friday time slot, every week at 11:00 PM ET. MonsterVision would typically show no more than two films per night, though several episodes were much longer, such as the 1997 "Super Bowl Sunday Special," which consisted of sixteen continuous hours of horror movies. That being said, on usual double feature nights, Joe Bob would appear anywhere between sixteen and twenty-four times throughout the movies, significantly more than he did on his previous program, Joe Bob's Drive-In Theater. In these segments, Briggs would discuss the films, and more, from the inside and outside of a staged trailer home with a green neon TNT sign in the background. Joe Bob was also frequently visited by one of a succession of 'mail girls,' including Honey (Honey Michelle Gregory), Reno, Kat (Kathy Shower), Summer (Cheryl Bartel), and Rusty (Renner St. John), who not only served as attractive, comedic 'sidekicks,' but also brought Briggs fan letters, sometimes from actual prisoners. TNT also added the segment Joe Bob's Last Call, which was used to showcase the final movie of the night. Similarly, the program was occasionally able to feature guests such as rapper and actor Ice-T, and directors Wes Craven and John Waters.

When it came to the movies themselves, MonsterVision, under Briggs, would sometimes stray away from the typical horror and science fiction films, showing westerns, blaxploitation, kung fu, dramas, comedies, and other film genres, specifically in the later years. Additionally, as a way to connect fans further to the movies being presented during episodes, MonsterVision was known for its early use of the internet at tnt.turner.com/monstervision. There, fans were able to chat in Joe Bob's Rec Room, participate in weekly caption contests to win T-shirts, take part in "Find That Flick" contests to win obscure films, send fan mail, see images from the set, get free postcards, learn more about Joe Bob, and find out about upcoming films. Nevertheless, before each movie, Briggs would often give the audience his formal on-air "Drive-in Totals," a list of what he considered to be the most notable, gory, or humorous points in the film, followed by a rating of up to four stars, usually all delivered in a deadpan style. Additionally, he frequently played on the term "kung fu" to describe unique action sequences, such as 'Quicksand Fu' in Mad Max Beyond Thunderdome. Briggs' introduction to Phantasm II, for example, comprised: 

After each commercial break, Joe Bob would deliver a diverting short or long monologue concerning observations he made about the film, as well as popular culture, society, and his thoughts about life in general. These could be more serious discussions, for example, of trivia concerning obscure film actors, or controversies such as the race debates surrounding films such as Big Trouble in Little China. Conversely, Briggs' pieces could be more lighthearted, with deliberately outrageous political statements and occasional banter with his film crew. Joe Bob frequently described his notional day-to-day activities, including supposed problems with his girlfriends (or lack thereof) and his four ex-wives (usually the fourth, "Wanda Bodeine"). Lastly, Briggs usually signed off each episode of MonsterVision with a casual debriefing on the movie just-ended, along with a series of deliberately bad jokes, and a reminder that "the drive-in will never die!"

Furthermore, during these sections, Briggs routinely criticized and lampooned TNT's censorship of the films, with frequent reference to the channel's owner, Ted Turner. This running gag culminated with a Halloween marathon of Friday the 13th movies, which portrayed strange occurrences throughout the night, leading to Joe Bob realizing that Turner was trying to 'kill' him. The final scene saw Joe Bob give an impassioned apology to Turner, claiming he was an amazing person, before the video feed cut off eerily. A similar stunt was staged in Blair Witch Project-themed scenes for a later horror marathon, with the host mysteriously missing.

Beginning on Saturday, June 7, 1997, the series moved to Saturday nights in order to avoid further conflicts with TNT sports broadcasts. Then, on Saturday, September 11, 1999, the program was almost completely revamped in order to attract a wider audience, particular more women, resulting in the creation of Joe Bob's Hollywood Saturday Night and MonsterVision. Moving from Dallas to Los Angeles, not only was the general aesthetic of the show changed to feel more 'Hollywood,' but the first film of each episode going forward tended to be more 'mainstream,' while the second was usually in accordance with traditional MonsterVision. Subsequently, this meant that the Joe Bob’s Last Call segment would be dropped altogether. Although the original formula of the program was now changed, this transition allowed for more guests, such as Rhonda Shear, and horror movie specials still remained a staple of the show. Nonetheless, possibly due to a decline in ratings, TNT was unable to fully justify the increased budget after the move to Los Angeles, thus shifting to a one-movie-a-night format starting on Saturday, January 15, 2000.

Cancellation and Shudder revival
Joe Bob Briggs hosted MonsterVision for a little over four years, and his presence was the main reason many fans tuned-in. However, the show's format change hinted at the eventual breakdown of the MonsterVision series. Briggs himself has stated that he believes TNT's scheduling of fewer horror and drive-in movies may have led to the program's fall. With that being said, on Saturday, July 8, 2000, Joe Bob unknowingly hosted MonsterVision for the last time when he aired Children of the Corn II: The Final Sacrifice. Days later, Briggs received a letter from TNT management, stating that "his services were no longer needed." Afterwards, the show returned to its original non-host format, the program's final transition. Yet, fans never received any sort of on-air closure, only officially learning about Joe Bob's departure through the main website. MonsterVision was then eventually removed from TNT's lineup after Saturday, September 16, 2000.

Briggs has since remained an active speaker and writer, and has contributed commentary tracks to several DVDs.

However, over 17 years since its cancellation, Briggs stated that Shudder had shown some interest in reviving MonsterVision. This ultimately resulted in Joe Bob's return to television in a marathon for the Shudder TV live feed. On Friday, July 13, 2018, at 9 PM EDT / 6 PM PDT, Shudder aired a roughly 26-hour and 35-minute special featuring 13 of the greatest horror movies of all time as chosen by Briggs himself. Despite some technical difficulties, these films included: Tourist Trap, Sleepaway Camp, Rabid, The Prowler, Sorority Babes in the Slimeball Bowl-O-Rama, Daughters of Darkness, Blood Feast, Basket Case, Re-Animator, Demons, The Legend of Boggy Creek, Hellraiser, and Pieces. Although there were no commercials, these movies contained several interruptions for Joe Bob's legendary "Drive-in Totals," insider stories, and amusing tangential rants. Additionally, these segments also included Darcy the Mail Girl (Diana Prince), who not only showed up in movie-themed outfits to banter with Joe Bob and bring him messages from fans, but also spent the entire time live-tweeting with viewers. Lastly, as with MonsterVision, the marathon had guests, including Felissa Rose during Sleepaway Camp and Lyle Blackburn for The Legend of Boggy Creek.

Following the unprecedented success of the "July 2018 Marathon," on Tuesday, September 5, 2018, Shudder announced that they had made the decision to greenlight two more specials for 2018, as well as The Last Drive-in with Joe Bob Briggs series beginning in 2019.

Films shown by Penn and Teller on MonsterVision

King Kong
Them!
Attack of the 50 Foot Woman
Queen of Outer Space
The Manster
Plan 9 from Outer Space
Mysterious Island
The Outer Limits (1963 TV series)
Billy the Kid Versus Dracula
Night of the Lepus 
The Golden Voyage of Sinbad
Sinbad and the Eye of the Tiger
The Howling
Clash of the Titans
The Thing
Frankenstein

Films shown by Joe Bob Briggs on MonsterVision

Donovan's Brain
Them!
The Creeping Unknown
Forbidden Planet
Godzilla, King of the Monsters!
Godzilla vs. Mothra
Godzilla vs. Monster Zero
Attack of the 50 Foot Woman
It! The Terror from Beyond Space
The Time Machine
The Birds
The Outer Limits: "Cold Hands, Warm Heart"
The Outer Limits: "I, Robot"
Four Days in November
She (1965)
Village of the Giants
The Silencers
Seconds
One Million Years B.C.
Prehistoric Women
When Dinosaurs Ruled the Earth
The Fearless Vampire Killers
Planet of the Apes
Escape from the Planet of the Apes
Conquest of the Planet of the Apes
Project X
Rosemary's Baby
Look What's Happened to Rosemary's Baby
Barbarella
The Valley of Gwangi
Hercules in New York
Tribes
Billy Jack
Shaft
Willy Wonka & the Chocolate Factory
Play Misty for Me
Duel
The Doberman Gang
Night of the Lepus
The Legend of Boggy Creek
Hammer
Superbeast
The Horror at 37,000 Feet
Theatre of Blood
Genesis II
High Plains Drifter
Soylent Green
Cleopatra Jones
American Graffiti
The Neptune Factor
The Golden Voyage of Sinbad
Sinbad and the Eye of the Tiger
The Exorcist
Exorcist II: The Heretic
It's Alive
It Lives Again
It's Alive III: Island of the Alive
Jaws
Jaws 2
The Devil's Rain
The Master Gunfighter
The Ultimate Warrior
The Omen
Logan's Run
Burnt Offerings
Carrie
King Kong
King Kong Lives
Overlords of the U.F.O.
Black Sunday
Orca
Damnation Alley
Coma
The Fury
Capricorn One
The Swarm
Invasion of the Body Snatchers
The Warriors
Phantasm
Phantasm II
Alien
Alien 3
Time After Time
Salem's Lot
Star Trek: The Motion Picture
Star Trek II: The Wrath of Khan
The Fog
Saturn 3
When Time Ran Out
Friday the 13th
Friday the 13th Part 2
Friday the 13th Part III
Friday the 13th: The Final Chapter
Friday the 13th: A New Beginning
Friday the 13th Part VI: Jason Lives
The Long Riders
The Blues Brothers
Alcatraz: The Whole Shocking Story
Smokey and the Bandit II
The Elephant Man
Somewhere in Time
Motel Hell
Midnight Offerings
The Funhouse
The Monster Club
Excalibur
The Hand
Clash of the Titans
Dragonslayer
Halloween II
Halloween III: Season of the Witch
Mad Max 2
Mad Max Beyond Thunderdome
The Beast Within
Swamp Thing
Death Valley
Conan the Barbarian
Conan the Destroyer
Red Sonja
Creepshow
Poltergeist
Poltergeist II: The Other Side
Poltergeist III
Megaforce
The Beastmaster
Beastmaster 2: Through the Portal of Time
Beastmaster III: The Eye of Braxus
Endangered Species
Tootsie
WarGames
Trading Places
2020 Texas Gladiators
Twilight Zone: The Movie
Metalstorm: The Destruction of Jared-Syn
Deathstalker
The Dead Zone
Endgame
Christine
Warrior of the Lost World
The NeverEnding Story
Gremlins
The Last Starfighter
Red Dawn
The Company of Wolves
Razorback
She (1984)
Trancers
Ghoulies
Ghoulies II
The Goonies
Cocoon
Back to the Future
The Protector
National Lampoon's European Vacation
Pee Wee's Big Adventure
The Return of the Living Dead
Return of the Living Dead Part II
Teen Wolf
Zone Troopers
Rocky IV
Highlander
Troll
Critters
Breeders
The Deliberate Stranger
Top Gun
Big Trouble in Little China
Maximum Overdrive
Howard the Duck
The Fly
Deadly Friend
From Beyond
Slaughter High
The Wraith
Little Shop of Horrors
Future Hunters
The Stepfather
Timestalkers
Dirty Dancing
The Gate
Predator
Spaceballs
Dragnet
Adventures in Babysitting
The Lost Boys
Steel Dawn
Howling III
Howling: New Moon Rising
Batteries Not Included
The Serpent and the Rainbow
Hairspray
Beetlejuice
The Seventh Sign
The Great Outdoors
Waxwork
The Kiss
They Live
Child's Play
Child's Play 2
Twins
Parents
Leviathan
Communion
Nightbreed
Xtro II: The Second Encounter
Peacemaker
Fear
Night of the Living Dead
Look Who's Talking Too
The Guyver
Mannequin Two: On the Move
Don't Tell Mom the Babysitter's Dead
The Sitter
Hot Shots!
The People Under the Stairs
Strays
Aces: Iron Eagle III
House IV
Poison Ivy 
Poison Ivy II: Lily
Twin Peaks: Fire Walk with Me
A League of Their Own
Project: Shadowchaser
Prelude to a Kiss
Tiger Claws
Buffy the Vampire Slayer
Raising Cain
Children of the Corn II: The Final Sacrifice
The Unnamable II: The Statement of Randolph Carter
Bram Stoker's Dracula
Love Potion No. 9
Frankenstein
Chained Heat II
Time Runner
Point of No Return
Robin Hood: Men in Tights
My Boyfriend's Back
Needful Things
The Hidden II
Warlock: The Armageddon
Skeeter
Malice
Look Who's Talking Now
Philadelphia Experiment II
Man's Best Friend
Surviving the Game
Hercules and the Amazon Women
Immortal Combat
CyberTracker
The Shawshank Redemption
Wes Craven's New Nightmare
Mary Shelley's Frankenstein
Replikator
In the Mouth of Madness
Pet Shop
Project Metalbeast
The Surgeon
Dolores Claiborne
Sleepstalker
Cyberjack
Ice Cream Man
Galaxis
Embrace of the Vampire
To the Limit
Voodoo
The American President
Dracula: Dead and Loving It
Grim
Fargo
Heaven's Prisoners
Within the Rock
The Nutty Professor
Theodore Rex
Joe's Apartment
Mars Attacks!
Body Armor

References

External links
 
 

Horror movie television series
1990s American comic science fiction television series
2000s American comic science fiction television series
1990s American horror television series
2000s American horror television series
1990s American variety television series
2000s American variety television series
1993 American television series debuts
2000 American television series endings
English-language television shows
TNT (American TV network) original programming
Midnight movie television series